

This is a list of the National Register of Historic Places listings in Dillingham Census Area, Alaska.

This is intended to be a complete list of the properties and districts on the National Register of Historic Places in Dillingham Census Area, Alaska, United States. The locations of National Register properties and districts for which the latitude and longitude coordinates are included below, may be seen in a Google map.

There are 3 properties and districts listed on the National Register in the census area, including one National Historic Landmark District.  Another property was once listed but has been delisted.

Current listings

|}

Former listings

|}

See also 

 List of National Historic Landmarks in Alaska
 National Register of Historic Places listings in Alaska

References 

Dillingham Census Area